Richard Peter Stoicheff (born 1956) is a Canadian academic. He is the 11th and current president of the University of Saskatchewan, succeeding the interim president, Gordon Barnhart.

Born in Ottawa, Ontario, the son of the physicist Boris P. Stoicheff, Stoicheff received an undergraduate degree in English and history from Queen's University in 1978 and a master's of arts in 1980 and PhD in 1983 in English literature from the University of Toronto. He joined the University of Saskatchewan's English department in 1986. From 2005 to 2010, he was vice-dean humanities and fine arts in the College of Arts and Science. In 2011, he was appointed dean.

References

1956 births
Living people
Canadian university and college faculty deans
People from Ottawa
Presidents of the University of Saskatchewan
Queen's University at Kingston alumni
Academic staff of the University of Saskatchewan
University of Toronto alumni